Sardine Creek is a stream in the U.S. state of Oregon. Rogue River.

References

Rivers of Oregon
Rivers of Jackson County, Oregon